The Battle of Lahira was fought between Mughal Empire and Sikhs in 1634.

Battle
Guru Hargobind's popularity became a cause of the tension between Sikhs and Mughals. The concerned Mughal Emperor Shah Jahan, sent his two generals, Lala Beg, the governor of Kabul, and Qamar Beg, with around 36,000  soldiers arrived at Bathinda to chastise Sikhs. The Mughal Generals in their desire for a quick victory and with the promise of great rewards marched their soldiers nonstop to the Guru's Position in extreme, bone-chilling winter of the Punjab. Guru had 3,000 Sikhs under his command, supported by 1000 Sikhs under Rai Jodh's command. Being outnumbered, the Sikhs employed guerilla warfare to great effect fully utilizing the extremely cold and lack of moonlight on the first night of battle to their advantage to thoroughly demoralize the exhausted Mughal soldiers. The main battle took place at Lehra Beg the next morning in which both the Mughal commanders were killed along with large numbers of Mughal soldiers. On the other side, 1200 Sikhs were killed. After the Mughal generals were killed, the Mughal army, defeated, and demoralized rushed back to Lahore. Guru Hargobind built Guru Sar at the site of the battle in order to commemorate the great victory.

See also

References

1634 in India
1634 in the Mughal Empire
Lahira
Lahira